Stephen L. Braggs (born August 29, 1965) is a former professional American football cornerback in the National Football League. He played seven seasons for the Cleveland Browns and the Miami Dolphins. He currently resides in Austin, TX.

1965 births
Living people
Players of American football from Houston
American football cornerbacks
Texas Longhorns football players
Cleveland Browns players
Miami Dolphins players
Berlin Thunder coaches
Sportspeople from Houston